Daniel Norrmén (born 11 February 1975) is a Swedish football manager who manages IFK Mariehamn.

Career

Playing career

Before the 1999 season, Norrmén signed for Swedish third tier side BP, helping them earn promotion to the Swedish second tier. Before the 2003 season, he signed for IFK Mariehamn in the Finnish third tier, helping them earn promotion to the Finnish top flight  for the first time, within 2 seasons.

Managerial career
In 2009, he was appointed manager of Åland. In 2021, Norrmén was appointed manager of IFK Mariehamn in the Finnish top flight after serving as assistant manager between 2016 and 2021.

References

1975 births
Association football midfielders
Ettan Fotboll players
Expatriate football managers in Finland
Expatriate footballers in Finland
IF Brommapojkarna players
IFK Mariehamn managers
IFK Mariehamn players
Kakkonen players
Living people
Superettan players
Swedish expatriate footballers
Swedish expatriate sportspeople in Finland
Swedish football managers
Swedish footballers
Veikkausliiga managers
Veikkausliiga players
Ykkönen players